On June 5, 1920, a shallow magnitude 8.2 earthquake struck offshore Hualien County, Empire of Japan (now Taiwan). It is currently the largest earthquake in Taiwan's modern history.

Tectonic summary
Taiwan is located within a complex zone of convergence between the Philippine and Eurasian Plates. Off the island's east coast, these plates converge at a rate of 75 mm per year. To the south of Taiwan, oceanic crust of the Eurasian Plate is subducting beneath the Philippine Plate, creating an island arc, the Luzon Arc. At Taiwan the oceanic crust has all been subducted and the arc is colliding with continental crust of the Eurasian Plate. To the north of Taiwan the Philippine Sea Plate is in contrast subducting beneath the Eurasian Plate, forming the Ryukyu Arc.

Earthquake
The earthquake had a moment-magnitude of 8.2, making it the largest in modern-day Taiwan. The USGS shakemap shows all areas of Taiwan felt shaking of between V and VII on the Modified Mercalli intensity scale. The shaking was also felt in southeast China, the island of Luzon in the Philippines, and southwest Japan.

Impact
Eight deaths and 24 injuries were reported. 1,530 houses were affected in the cities of Taipei, Taitung, Hsinchu and Taoyuan, of which 273 were destroyed, and 277 others were severely damaged.

See also
 List of earthquakes in Taiwan
 List of earthquakes in 1920
 2018 Hualien earthquake
 2019 Hualien earthquake

References

1920 earthquakes
Earthquakes in Taiwan
Hualien City
Hualien County
History of Taiwan
1920 in Taiwan